Sharon Hill may refer to:

 Sharon Hill, Pennsylvania, a borough in Delaware County, Pennsylvania, United States
 Sharon Hill station (SEPTA Regional Rail)
 Sharon Hill station (SEPTA Route 102)
 Sharon A. Hill,  geologist, science writer and speaker